Matthew Joseph Kacsmaryk (born 1977) is a United States district judge of the United States District Court for the Northern District of Texas. He was nominated to the position by President Donald Trump.

Education and career
Kacsmaryk received his Bachelor of Arts, summa cum laude, from Abilene Christian University in 1999 and his Juris Doctor with honors from the University of Texas School of Law in 2003.

From 2003 to 2008, he was an associate in the Dallas office of Baker Botts, where he focused on commercial, constitutional, and intellectual property litigation. From 2008 through 2013, he was an assistant United States attorney in the Northern District of Texas where he was lead counsel in over 75 criminal appeals and co-counsel in high-profile criminal and terrorism trials. In 2013, Kacsmaryk received the attorney general's award for excellence in furthering the interests of U.S. national security for his work in United States v. Aldawsari. He was deputy general counsel to First Liberty Institute.  He has been a member of the Fort Worth chapter of the Federalist Society since 2012. He has been a member of the red mass committee for the Roman Catholic diocese of Ft. Worth.

Federal judicial service 
On September 7, 2017, President Donald Trump nominated Kacsmaryk to serve as a United States district judge of the United States District Court for the Northern District of Texas, to the seat vacated by judge Mary Lou Robinson, who assumed senior status on February 3, 2016. On December 13, 2017, a hearing on his nomination was held before the Senate Judiciary Committee. On January 3, 2018, his nomination was returned to the president under Rule XXXI, Paragraph 6 of the United States Senate. On January 5, 2018, Trump announced his intent to renominate Kacsmaryk to a federal judgeship. On January 8, 2018, his renomination was sent to the Senate. On January 18, 2018, his nomination was reported out of committee by an 11–10 vote.

The American Bar Association rated Kacsmaryk "qualified" for the nomination, which is the association's second-highest ranking, below "well qualified”. However, Senate Democrats and a number of LGBT advocacy groups opposed his nomination due to his writings and comments on LGBT rights and women's contraceptive rights. He has worked on cases opposing certain LGBT protections in housing, employment, and health care. He has referred to homosexuality as "disordered", and to being transgender as a "delusion" and a "mental disorder". He opposed the Roe v. Wade Supreme Court ruling that had legalized abortion in the United States.

On January 3, 2019, his nomination was returned to Trump under Rule XXXI, Paragraph 6 of the United States Senate. On January 23, 2019, Trump announced his intent to renominate Kacsmaryk for a federal judgeship. His nomination was sent to the Senate later that day. On February 7, 2019, his nomination was reported out of committee by a 12–10 vote. On June 18, 2019, the Senate voted 52–44 to invoke cloture on his nomination. On June 19, 2019, his nomination was confirmed by a 52–46 vote. He received his judicial commission on June 21, 2019.

Kacsmaryk serves the Amarillo division of the United States District Court for the Northern District of Texas, which encompasses 26 counties in the Texas Panhandle.

Notable cases 

According to The Washington Post, conservative groups have employed "forum shopping" in filing lawsuits within Kacsmaryk's federal district against many Biden administration's policies; since Kacsmaryk is the only federal judge in his district, any lawsuit filed there is guaranteed to be presided over by him.

In 2021, Kacsmaryk ordered the reinstatement of a Trump administration policy that required that asylum seekers wait outside U.S. territory while their claims are processed. In his order, he said that the Biden administration had ended the policy without fully considering the consequences. His decision was overturned by the Supreme Court of the United States on June 30, 2022.

In November 2022, Kacsmaryk ruled that the Biden administration violated the Administrative Procedure Act while misinterpreting the Affordable Care Act to enforce the prohibition of discrimination based on sexual orientation and gender identity within "on the basis of sex".

Also in 2022, Kacsmaryk vacated protections for transgender workers enacted by the Biden administration, citing Bostock v. Clayton County saying that Title VII  "prohibits employers from discriminating against employees for being gay or transgender, "but not necessarily [in the case of] all correlated conduct."

In November 2022, the Alliance Defending Freedom, a conservative legal group, filed a lawsuit in Kacsmaryk's federal district, challenging the Food and Drug Administration's approval of mifepristone in 2000; the drug is a common form of medication abortion. The location of the filing guaranteed that Kacsmaryk received the case, Alliance for Hippocratic Medicine v. US Food and Drug Administration, with the first hearing being held in March 2023.

Personal life
Kacsmaryk is married to his wife Shelly. They have five children.

See also
Donald Trump judicial appointment controversies

References

External links 

 

1977 births
Living people
21st-century American judges
21st-century American lawyers
Abilene Christian University alumni
Anti-LGBT sentiment
Assistant United States Attorneys
Federalist Society members
Judges of the United States District Court for the Northern District of Texas
People associated with Baker Botts
People from Gainesville, Florida
Texas lawyers
United States district court judges appointed by Donald Trump
University of Texas School of Law alumni